Moses Haughton (7 July 1773 – 26 June 1849) was a British engraver and painter, often of miniatures.

Life
Born in Wednesbury in the Black Country, the nephew of the painter Moses Haughton the elder, he moved to Liverpool in 1790. 
There he became a friend of William Roscoe and possibly studied under George Stubbs before enrolling at the Royal Academy Schools in London in 1795.    At the R.A.  he was a classmate of J. M. W. Turner.  In 1796 William Roscoe mentions Haughton as a 'young engraver' of note.

From 1803, Haughton was the resident engraver to Henry Fuseli, and it was largely through Haughton's prints that Fuseli's work became widely known; 
He painted a well known Miniature of Fuseli and his wife Sophia Rawlins.  He became a close friend of Henry Fuseli, and resided with Fuseli's family in the Keeper's Apartments at Somerset House.  After Fuseli's death,  Mrs. Fuseli lived with the Haughton family until her own death.

Haughton exhibited at the Royal Academy from 1808 to 1848. 
Two of his miniatures, "The Love Dream", and "The Captive" were engraved by R. W. Sievier; other portraits were also engraved.  
Amongst his notable portrait subjects were Erasmus Darwin and Sir Joshua Reynolds.

References

Attribution

External links

Moses Haughton the younger on Artnet
Engraved portrait of Henry Fuseli (Grosvenor prints)

1773 births
1849 deaths
18th-century English painters
English male painters
19th-century English painters
English engravers
English portrait painters
Portrait miniaturists
People from Wednesbury
19th-century English male artists
18th-century English male artists